The Tennors were a Jamaican rocksteady and reggae vocal group in the 1960s and '70s. Among the band's hits was "Ride Yu Donkey" in 1968. The song was featured on the soundtrack to the 2005 film Broken Flowers.

History
The group was formed in Kingston in the mid-1960s by singer George "Clive" Murphy who formed a duo with Maurice "Professor" Johnson. They called themselves the Tennor Twins. They auditioned a song called "Pressure and Slide" in 1967 while sitting in the back of a taxicab for arranger Jackie Mittoo of Studio One. Murphy and Johnson were then joined by Norman Davis, and the trio recorded the song backed by Mittoo. This, their first single, was one of the major Jamaican hits for the year 1967,.

The Tennors then went on to form their own label that grew its own stable of artists. The accidental death of Johnson reduced the trio back to a duo, and Murphy and Davis continued as songwriters. They offered their song, "Ride Yu Donkey", to many artists, but ended up recording it themselves after it was turned down. The song was released in 1968 and was a huge hit.

Other songs by the Tennors included "Cleopatra (I've Got to Get You Off My Mind)", "Grandpa", "Massi Massa", "Girl You Hold Me" and "Rub Me Khaki", "Sufferer", "Sign of the Times", "Biff Baff" (aka "Traitor"), "Bow Legged Girl", "Little Things", "Cherry" and "Oh My Baby".

The group became a trio again with the addition of Ronnie Davis in 1968. Other singers who were in the Tennors included Nehemiah Davis, George Dekker, Howard Spencer, and Hilton Wilson. The trio backed singer Jackie Bernard on "Another Scorcher", and moved towards reggae with the song "Reggae Girl".

Under Sonia Pottinger, they recorded "Gee Whiz" and "Give Me Bread". In 1970, The Tennors worked with Treasure Isle producer Duke Reid on the song "Hopeful Village". It was a hit and won the group the Best Performer title at that year's Jamaican Independence Song Festival. The band worked again with Reid in 1973 on "Weather Report", adapted from "The Only Living Boy In New York" by Simon and Garfunkel.

After that, the group folded. Murphy emigrated to the United States and started a solo career under the name Clive Tennors. He released a solo album, Ride Yu Donkey, in 1991.

In March 2012, after a near 35 year hiatus, The Tennors reunited with George Murphy aka "Clive Tennors", Ronnie Davis. Currently Ronnie Davis works with The Tennors only when officially contracted and Sadiki left the group in 2012.

New stereo recordings of the original songs  has been released for 2019 and released on Burning Sounds Records which is the early material recorded by The Tennors that has been revisited to create this unique collection. The sixteen classic cuts, curated and recorded under the aegis of heavyweight reggae producer Delroy Williams . Includes a Booklet containing Interview with Clive Tennor

References

External links
 
Greene, Jo Anne, 

Jamaican reggae musical groups
Rocksteady musical groups
Island Records artists
Trojan Records artists